This is a list of current and defunct leagues of American football and Canadian football.

Leagues in North America

Current professional leagues in North America

Professional outdoor leagues 
Major
 National Football League (NFL), 1920–
Originally American Professional Football Conference, American Professional Football Association (1920–1921)
Merged with the American Football League (1960–69)
 Canadian Football League (CFL), 1958–2019; 2021– 
Formed from Interprovincial Rugby Football Union (1909) and Western Interprovincial Football Union (1936).
Grey Cup Canadian Football Championships since 1909
Other
 Liga de Fútbol Americano Profesional (LFA), 2016–2020; 2022–
 XFL, 2020; 2023–
 United States Football League (USFL), 2022–

Professional arena/indoor leagues 
 Indoor Football League, (14 teams) 2009–
Formed from United Indoor Football and Intense Football League
 Champions Indoor Football, (8 teams) 2015–
Formed from Champions Professional Indoor Football League and Lone Star Football League
 National Arena League, (7 teams) 2017–
 American West Football Conference, (3 teams) 2019–
 Fan Controlled Football, (8 teams) 2021–
 American Indoor Football Alliance, (7 teams) 2022–

Current Developmental leagues 
 Gridiron Developmental Football League, 2010–
 Rivals Professional Football League, 2015–

Current semi-pro|amateur leagues 
 Chicagoland Football League, 1917–1934, 2005–
 Northern Football Conference, 1954–
 Eastern Football League, 1961–
 Empire Football League, 1969–
 Mason-Dixon Football League, 1978–
 Alberta Football League, 1984–
 The Minor Football League, 1993–
 New England Football League, 1994–
 National Public Safety Football League, 1997–
 Rocky Mountain Football League, 1997–
 MidStates Football League, 1999–
 Maritime Football League, 2001–
 The Pacific Coast Football League, 2006–
 Florida Football Alliance, 2007–
 East Coast Football Association, 2007–
 Northern Elite Football League, 2008–
 Atlantic Coast Football Alliance, 2009–
 Texas United Football Association, 2010–
 Amateur to Professional Developmental Football League, 2012–
 American 7s Football League, 2014–
 Puerto Rico American Football League, 2014–
 Atlantic Football Association, 2014–
 Florida Champion Football League, 2017–
 Cactus Football League, 2018–
 North Louisiana Football Alliance, 2019–
 Southern Elite Football League, 2021–
 Mid-West United Football league, 2021–
 Heartland Football Association, 2022–

Current Flag football leagues 
 National Gay Flag Football League, 2002–
 DC Gay Flag Football League, 2009–
 American Flag Football League, 2018–

Current Collegiate and amateur leagues 
 National Collegiate Athletic Association, 1906–
 National Federation of State High School Associations, 1920–
 California Community College Athletic Association, 1929–
 Collegiate Sprint Football League, 1934–
 National Junior College Athletic Association, 1938–
 National Association of Intercollegiate Athletics, 1940–
 U Sports, 1961–
 Quebec Junior Football League, 1970–
 Canadian Junior Football League, 1974–
 Organización Nacional Estudiantil de Fútbol Americano, 1978–
 Atlantic Football League, 2009–
 Intercollegiate Club Football Federation, 2010–
 National Club Football Association, 2010–
 Hohokam Junior College Athletic Conference, 2019–

Current women's leagues

Outdoor leagues 
 Women's Football Alliance, 2009–
 United States Women's Football League, 2010–
 Western Women's Canadian Football League, 2011–
 Utah Girls Tackle Football League, 2015–
 Women's National Football Conference, 2019–
 Central Canadian Women's Football League, 2022–

Women's Indoor/Arena leagues 
 X League, 2009–
Operated as the Lingerie Football League from 2009 to 2012 and then as the Legends Football League from 2013 to 2019.
 Women's Arena Football League, 2012–

Planned leagues in North America 
 American Spring Football League (ASFL), 2024–
 Major League Football (MLF), proposed to begin in 2023
 Major League Football (MLFB), proposed to begin in 2023 (cancelled seasons in 2016 and 2022)
 American Patriot League (APL), proposed to begin in 2023
 Freedom Football League (FFL), proposed to begin in 2023

Historical leagues in North America

Major outdoor leagues 
 Western Pennsylvania Professional Football Circuit, 1892–19056
 National Football League, 1902
 Ohio Independent Championship (Ohio League), 1903–19196
 Interprovincial Rugby Football Union, 1907–19597
 New York Pro Football League, c. 1913–19206
 American Football League, 1926, 1936–1937, and 1940–1941 (all unrelated, three separate leagues)
 California Winter League, 1927–1928
 Western Interprovincial Football Union, 1936–19607
 All-America Football Conference, 1946–19491
 American Football League, 1960–19692
 World Football League, 1974–1975
 United States Football League, 1983–1985

Minor outdoor leagues 
 Wilmington Football League (1922–1925, 1929–1935, 1940–1941, 1946–1955)
 Anthracite League (1924)
 Ohio Valley League, 1925–1929
 Eastern League of Professional Football (1926)
 Pacific Coast League, 1926
 Eastern League of Professional Football, 1926–1927
 Anthracite League, 1928–1929
 Eastern Football League, 1932–1933
Became Interstate Football League in 1933
 Greater New York League, 1934–1935
Originally the New Jersey Football Circuit (1934)
 American Football League, 1934
 American Legion League, 1934–1935
 Northwest Football League, 1935–1938
 Midwest Football League, 1935–1937, became American Professional Football Association in 1938, American Football League in 1939
 Dixie League, 1936–1947 – originally South Atlantic Football Association
 American Association 1936–1941/American Football League 1946–19503
 New England Football League, 1936
 Virginia-Carolina Football League, 1937
 California Football League, 1938
 Eastern Pennsylvania Football League, 1938
 American Football League, 1938–19394
 Pacific Coast Professional Football League, 1940–1948
 Northeast Football League, 1940–1942
 Northwest War Industries Football League, 1942
 Eastern Football League, 1944
 American Football League, 19445
 Virginia Negro League, 1946
 Central States Football League, 1948–1953
 Pacific Football Conference, 1957–1958
 American Football Conference, 1959–1961
Low-level fall league that was fully organized in September 1959 with five independent teams who played the other teams sporadically. The original teams were Duquesne Ironmen (Pennsylvania),  Melvindale Redskins (Michigan), Toledo Tornadoes, Dayton Triangles (Ohio) and Newark Rams (New Jersey). Players were from both pro and college teams. Teams also end up play in Sarnia, Zaneville (Ohio Colts), Port Huron and Detroit, while Toledo Tornadoes leave for the larger United Football League (1961–1964).
 United Football League, 1961–1964
 Central States Football League, 1962–1975
 Atlantic Coast Football League, 1962–1971, 1973
 Midwest Football League, 1962–1978
 Southern Football League, 1963–1965
 North Pacific Football League, 1963–1966
 New England Football League, 1964–1967
Renamed North Atlantic Football League in 1967
 Continental Football League, 1965–1969
 North American Football League, 1965–1966
 Professional Football League of America, 1965–1967
 Texas Football League 1966–1968
 United American Football League, 1967
 South Carolina Football League, 1967
 Trans-American Football League, 1970–1971
 Midwest Professional Football League, 1970–1972
 Seaboard Football League, 1971–1974
 Southwestern Football League, 1972–1973
 California Football League (1974–1982)California Football League, 1974–1982
 American Football Association, 1978–1983
 International Football League, 1984 (never played)
 World League of American Football 1991–1992/NFL Europe 1995–2007
 Professional Spring Football League, 1992
 Fan Ownership League, 1996 (never played)
 Regional Football League, 1999
 International Football Federation, 2000 (never played)
 Spring Football League, 2000
 XFL, 2001
 World Football League, 2008–2010
 United Football League, 2009–2012
 Hawaii Professional Football League, 2011 (never played)
 Stars Football League, 2011–2013
 North American Football League, 2014 (never played)
 Fall Experimental Football League, 2014–2015
 The Spring League, 2017–2021
 Trinity Professional Spring Football League, 2018  (never played)
 Your Call Football, 2018–2019
 Alliance of American Football, 2019
 Fútbol Americano de México (FAM), 2019–2022
1: Three teams merged into the NFL
2: Agreed to merger with the NFL in 1966, with merger completed in 1970
3: American Association suspended operations for duration of U.S. involvement in World War II; in 1946 the AA was renamed American Football League
4: Known as the American Professional Football Association in 1938; renamed American Football League in 1939; dissolution after 1939 season caused by formation of 1940–1941 AFL major league
5: Merged with PCPFL in 1945
6: Informal association of teams
7: Merged to form the CFL in 1958

Indoor leagues 
 World Series of Football, 1902–03
 Arena Football League, 1987–2008, 2010–2019, 2024–
 Professional Indoor Football League, 1998–2000 (Bought out by Af2 in 2001)
 Indoor Football League, 1999–2000 (Bought out by Af2 in 2001;not related to the Indoor Football League that began play in 2009)
 Indoor Professional Football League, 1999–2001
 Arenafootball2 (af2), 2000–2009 (assets acquired in the same transaction as that noted above for Arena Football League)
 National Indoor Football League, 2001–2007
 American Professional Football League, 2003–2013
 Intense Football League, 2004–2008 (merged into current incarnation of the Indoor Football League)
 United Indoor Football, 2005–2008 (merged into current incarnation of the Indoor Football League)
 American Indoor Football, 2005–2010, 2012–2016
 Continental Indoor Football League, 2006–2014
 World Indoor Football League, 2007
 Southern Indoor Football League, 2008–2011 (teams divided into either the Lone Star Football League, the Professional Indoor Football League, or American Indoor Football)
 Ultimate Indoor Football League, 2011–2014
 Lone Star Football League, 2012–2014
 Professional Indoor Football League, 2012–2015
 Champions Professional Indoor Football League, 2013–2014
 X-League Indoor Football, 2014–2015
 Arena Football Association, 2021-2022

Collegiate and amateur leagues 
 Quebec Rugby Football Union, 1883–1944
 Ontario Rugby Football Union, 1883–1960
 American Football Union, 1886–1895
 Texas Sixman Football League, 1999–2012

Women's leagues 
 Women's Professional Football League, 1965–1973
 National Women's Football League, 1974–1982
 Women's Professional Football League, 1999–2007
 National Women's Football Association, 2000–2008
 Women's American Football League, formed 2001, became the AFWL in 2002
 American Football Women's League (AFWL), 2002
 Women's Football Association, 2002–2003
 Women's Football League, 2002–2007
 Women's Football League Association, 2021 (never played)

Leagues outside North America

Current professional leagues outside North America 
 Europe – European League of Football (ELF), began play in June 2021
 Japan – X-League, began play in 1971

Current professional, minor professional, semi professional and amateur leagues outside North America 
Central and South America:
 – CBFA Brasil Futebol Americano
 – FECOFA Federación Colombiana de Football Americano
 – LUFA Liga Uruguaya de Football Americano

Europe:
 – AFL Austrian Football League
 – BFL Belgian Football League
 – HFL Hrvatska Football Liga
 – CLAF Česká Liga Amerického Fotbalu
 – NL National Ligaen
 – VL Vaahteraliiga
 – LEFA Ligue Élite de Football Américain
 – GFL German Football League
 – HFL Hungarian Football League
 – IAFL Irish American Football League
 – FIDAF Prima Divisione FIDAF
 – AFBN AFBN Division One
 – PFL Polish Football League
 – LPFA Liga Portuguesa de Futebol Americano
 – CNFA Campionatul Naţional de Fotbal American
 – UAFR Russian American Football Championship
 – SLAF Slovenská futbalová liga
 – SNFL Slovenian Football League
 – NLS Nacionalna Liga Srbije
 – LNFA Liga Nacional de Fútbol Americano
 – Superserien
 – NLA Nationalliga A
 – NSFL Non Professional Swiss Romande American Football League
 – TKFL Türkiye Korumalı Futbol Ligi
 – ULAF Super League
 – BAFANL BAFA National Leagues
///////// – CEFL Central European Football League
/// – EEAFC Eastern European American Football Cup
/ – EESL Eastern European Super League

Asia:
 – IFL Israel Football League
 – Korea American Football Association
 – ATFFP Philippine–American Football League
 – CNFL Chinese National Football League
 – EFLI Elite Football League of India

Oceania:
 – Gridiron Australia
 – Australian Gridiron League
 – Ladies Gridiron League
 – New Zealand American Football Association

Defunct minor leagues around the world 
 - EFL European Football League 1986-2018
 – Australian American Football League 1984–1998
 – Torneio Touchdown 2009–2015
// – Continental Football League, 1965–1969
//// Intercontinental Football League – Intended to begin play in 1975, folded before first game
 – BCAFL British Collegiate American Football League, 1985–2007
 – BAFL British American Football League, 1987–2010
 –  ISAF Icelandic Society for American Football, 1988–1991
///// International League of American Football – Intended to begin play in 1990, folded before first game
///// World League of American Football/NFL Europe/NFL Europa, 1991–1992, 1995–2007
///// Football League of Europe, 1994–1995
 – National Gridiron League of Australia 1991–1995
 – BIG6 BIG6 European Football League
 – CL IFAF Europe Champions League
 – Philippine Tackle Football League

Collegiate and amateur leagues 
  – List of Japanese collegiate American football programs
  – British Universities American Football League

See also 
International Federation of American Football (IFAF), international governing body for American football
European Federation of American Football (EFAF)
Women's Football in the United States
British American Football Association (BAFA)
Association of Professional Football Leagues – compact of NFL and three minor leagues, 1946–1948
List of professional sports leagues#Football: American and Canadian
American-style football quarterback leaderboard
List of female American football teams

Notes

References

External links 
, Developmental Football USA news site

 
American football leagues
 
American footbal